The Comorian Ambassador to the United States is the official representative of the Government of the Comores to the Government of the United States.

List of representatives

References 

 
United States
Comoros